The Microlophus heterolepis is a species of lava lizard endemic to Chile and Peru.

References

heterolepis
Lizards of South America
Reptiles of Chile
Reptiles of Peru
Reptiles described in 1834
Taxa named by Arend Friedrich August Wiegmann